Frank Pappa Show is a Finnish talk show. It first aired on Finnish TV in 1991 and last aired in 1994.

See also
List of Finnish television series

External links
 

Finnish television shows
1991 Finnish television series debuts
1994 Finnish television series endings
1990s Finnish television series
Kolmoskanava original programming
MTV3 original programming